Rory Blease (born 16 August 1960, Bebington) is an English former footballer.

Blease briefly played in The Football League for Chester City during 1984–85, with his four appearances, including setting up a goal for Stuart Rimmer against Chesterfield.

Previously, Blease had played for Caernarfon Town and after leaving Chester he went on to make 22 appearances in the Gola League for Northwich Victoria.

References

1960 births
Living people
People from Bebington
English Football League players
National League (English football) players
Association football midfielders
English footballers
Caernarfon Town F.C. players
Chester City F.C. players
Northwich Victoria F.C. players